Gustav Glogau (6 June 1844, Laukischken (Kreis Labiau, Ostpreußen) - 22 March 1895, Laurion (Greece)) was a German philosopher of religion and an academic. He worked for the Technical College (1881-1883) in Zurich as a private tutor and, later, ordinarius, teaching philosophy and pedagogy subjects. He taught as a professor at the Halle University (1883-), Kiel University (1884-).

Glogau was a student of the German philologist Chajim Heymann Steinthal. The name is sometime misspelled as Gustav Grogau.

Literary works
 Abriss der philosophischen Grundwissenschaften, 2 vols., 1880-1888

References

German philosophers
Philosophers of religion
1844 births
1895 deaths
German male writers